Branson City Park Historic District was a national historic district located at Branson, Taney County, Missouri.  The district encompassed one contributing site and two contributing structures built between 1934 and 1943 as part of a Works Progress Administration project.  They were the Mang Field Bleachers, Mang baseball field and the Stone Bleachers. The bleacher structures were good examples of the use of rustic native stone by means of the slab rock technique.  The park has been demolished and replaced with The Branson Landing.

It was listed on the National Register of Historic Places in 1993.

References

Works Progress Administration in Missouri
Historic districts on the National Register of Historic Places in Missouri
Bungalow architecture in Missouri
Buildings and structures in Taney County, Missouri
National Register of Historic Places in Taney County, Missouri